There are currently 217 batters in the 50 Home Runs Club:

Progression
Stacey Nuveman hit her 86th career home run against Kristen Hunter of the Oregon State Beavers May 4, 2002. She surpassed former Arizona Wildcats Laura Espinoza (the original record setter) and Leah Braatz, who had matched the total in 1998. Lauren Chamberlain hit her 91st home run off Kenzie Grimes April 30, 2015 vs. the North Texas Mean Green. Jocelyn Alo hit her 96th home run off Ashley Murphy March 11, 2022 vs. the Hawaii Rainbow Wahine. Katiyana Mauga became the third player to reach 90 home runs when she tied Nuveman May 19, 2017, against the New Mexico State Aggies. Jessie Harper became the fourth player to reach 90 home runs May 21, 2021, facing Courtney Coppersmith of the UMBC Retrievers. Alo became the fifth player to reach 90 home runs February 11, 2022, facing Bri Bower of the Mississippi State Bulldogs. Mia Davidson became the sixth player to reach 90 home runs May 7, 2022, facing Shelbi Sunseri of the LSU Tigers. Alo is the first player to reach 100 home runs March 20, 2022, facing Katherine Serna of the Iowa Hawkeyes.

Slugging Percentage
In addition, there are currently 23 hitters in the 50 home runs club that amassed a slugging percentage of at least .800% in their career:

Lauren Chamberlain (583/607 = .960%); Stacey Nuveman (653/691 = .945%); Jocelyn Alo (561/606 = .925%); Oli Keohohou (418/454 = .920%); Sierra Romero (604/685 = .881%); Megan Baltzell (557/639 = .871%); Torrian Wright (358/411 = .871%); Erika Piancastelli (548/631 = .868%); Lexie Elkins (487/567 = .859%); Linda Rush (537/631 = .851%); Kate Gordon (540/636 = .849%); Kaitlin Cochran (596/706 = .844%); Shelby Pendley (579/696 = .832%);  Katiyana Mauga (530/639 = .829%); Amber Jackson (637/769 = .828%); Jenny Topping (537/654 = .821%); Jessica Warren (604/737 = .819%); Jenny Dalton (576/707 = .814%); Lauren May (443/545 = .813%); Kristen Rivera (517/637 = .811%); Jen Yee (562/693 = .811%); Jennifer Gilbert (581/717 = .810%); Shellie Robinson (546/678 = .805%).

Records & Milestones
Laura Espinoza hit an NCAA all-time season and senior class record 37 home runs in 1995; Lexie Elkins is the only player to make the list without hitting a single home run in a full season of play, which came in her freshman year in 2013. Elkins holds the junior class record by hitting 32 in 2015. Addison Barnard set the sophomore record by hitting 33 in 2022. Jocelyn Alo (30 in 2018, 34 in 2021 and 34 in 2022) is the only player to hit 30 home runs in three different seasons. Espinoza (30 in 1994 and 37 in 1995), Lauren Chamberlain (30 in 2012 and 30 in 2013) and Alo are the only players with two 30-homer seasons. Kelly Majam in 2010, Chamberlain in 2012 and Alo share the record for most home runs by a freshman with 30. Katiyana Mauga is the only player in NCAA history to have 20 or more home runs every year of her career. Christi Orgeron set a season record when 6 of her 22 went for grand slams in 2012; Haley Outon, Taylor Edwards and Stephanie Best each hit a record two grand slams in a single game, Best's both coming in the same inning. From March 20 to April 2, 2009, Kaitlin Cochran hit 7 homers in 7 consecutive games, another NCAA record. Jenny Dalton is one of the numerous players from the list to achieve a three-homer game (second best), one of the elite to do it twice and is the only player to do it in the same year of 1995; Jenna Cone and Suzy Brookshire each achieved the feat once in 2021. Jen Yee's 29 home runs in 2009 helped her to an all-time season record 1.270 slugging percentage. Veronica Nelson was walked 108 times in 2002 while hitting 9 homers for another all-time NCAA season record.

Along with Espinoza in 1995, Chambers in 2009, Nuveman in 1999, Majam in 2010 and Alo (in 2018 and 34 in 2021), Elkins (32 in 2015 and 24 in 2014), Camilla Carrera (32 in 2012), Megan Baltzell (30 in 2013 and 27 in 2015), Danyele Gomez (30 in 2006), DJ Sanders (29 in 2017), Jessie Harper (29 in 2019), Angeline Quiocho (28 in 2010), Dalton (28 in 1995 and 25 in 1996), Best (26 in 2005), Mia Davidson (26 in 2019), Bailey Hemphill (26 in 2019), Kelsey Horton (25 in 2018), Katiyana Mauga (26 in 2015 and 25 in 2017), Alex Hugo (25 in 2014), Kristen Rivera (25 in 2003), Leah Braatz (25 in 1998), Kelly Kretschman (25 in 1998) all rank in the top 10 for single-season home runs. Espinoza in 1994 and 1995, Chambers in 2009, Nuveman in 1999, Majam in 2010, Elkins in 2015, Carrera in 2012, Baltzell in 2013, Gomez in 2006, Best in 2005, Hugo in 2014, Rivera in 2003,  Braatz in 1998 and (21 in 1997), Kretschman in 1998, Dalton in 1996, Nohara in 2011, Benyi in 2004, Topping in 2000, Morgan Noad and Tina Iosefa (both with 23 in 2016), Sanders in 2017, Alo in 2018 and 2021, Harper in 2019 were all tops for those respective NCAA years.

Finally, with Nuveman in 1999, Nelson in 2002, Chamberlain in 2013, Espinoza in 1994 and (12 in 1993), Dalton in 1996, (7 in 1993 and 16 in 1994), Benyi in 2004 and (8 in 2003), Leticia Pineda (14 in 1996 and 16 in 1997), Jennie Finch (11 in 2001), Mackenzie Vandergeest (20 in 2011), Tairia Flowers (22 in 2003), Claire Sua (17 in 2003 and 10 in 2004), Samantha Findlay (21 in 2005), Jenae Leles (7 in 2006 and 10 in 2007), Cochran (14 in 2008), Mindy Cowles (18 in 2008), B.B. Bates (5 in 2010), Andrea Harrison (17 in 2010), Katelyn Boyd (18 in 2011), Kaila Hunt (21 in 2012), Amanda Locke (18 in 2012), Pendley (22 in 2013), Keilani Ricketts (15 in 2013), Jessica Shults (7 in 2013), Lauren Haeger (20 in 2014 and 19 in 2015), Sydney Romero (10 in 2016 and 12 in 2017), Jessica Warren (21 in 2018) and Alo (34 in 2021) all won national championships those years; Stacie Chambers and Harrison share the Women's College World Series record for home runs with four each in 2009 and 2010 respectively. For their careers, Alo (Big 12), Jessie Harper and Katiyana Mauga (Pac-12), Gomez (Sun Belt), Warren (ACC), Sierra Romero (Big Ten), Kate Gordon (CAA), Jennifer Gilbert (MAC), Morgan Noad (Big South), Jenna Cone (A-10), Erika Piancastelli (Southland), Kelsey Horton (WAC), Best (A-Sun), Mia Davidson (SEC), Angeline Quiocho (MWC), Samantha Fischer (WCC), Vicky Galasso (Big Sky), Carrera (USA), Dara Toman (Horizon), Laura Taylor (Big East), Amy Baker (MVC), Lauren May (Ivy), Deanna Dovak (MAAC), Hayley Norton (NEC), Lindsay Thomas (Southern), Madison Perrigan (American), Ashley Ellis and Daniela Pappano (OVC), Darian Tautalafua (Big West) and Torrian Wright (MEAC) all own those conference crowns for home runs.

References

Links
NCAA Division I softball career .400 batting average list
NCAA Division I softball career 200 RBIs list

College softball in the United States lists